Vilhjálmur Þórmundur Vilhjálmsson (born 26 April 1946) is an Icelandic lawyer and politician who was mayor of Reykjavík 2006–2007 and was the chairman of the executive committee of the City Council of Reykjavik. He has been a member of Reykjavik's City Council since 1982.

References

External links
Political profile

Mayors of Reykjavík
Vilhjalmsson, Vilhalmur
Social Democratic Alliance politicians
Vilhjalmsson, Vilhalmur